Carlos Gabriel Villalba Rivas (born 19 July 1998) is an Argentinian footballer who plays as a midfielder for Platense, on loan from Talleres in the Argentine Primera División.

Career

Rentistas
After moving to the club on loan prior to the 2020 season, Villalba made his league debut for Rentistas on 16 February 2020, playing the entirety of a 2–0 home victory over Nacional. He scored his first and only goal for the club nearly a year later, the first in a 2–1 victory over Cerro Largo. Rentistas wished to extend the loan into June 2021 following its expiry in early 2021, but the two clubs couldn't reach a deal and he returned to Talleres.

References

External links

1998 births
Living people
Argentine footballers
Association football midfielders
People from Resistencia, Chaco
Sportspeople from Chaco Province
Talleres de Córdoba footballers
C.A. Rentistas players
Club Atlético Platense footballers
Uruguayan Primera División players
Expatriate footballers in Uruguay
Argentine expatriate sportspeople in Uruguay